is a Japanese paralympic badminton player. He participated at the 2020 Summer Paralympics in the badminton competition, winning the bronze medal in the men's doubles WH1–WH2 event with his teammate, Daiki Kajiwara.

Achievements

Paralympic Games 
Men's doubles

BWF Para Badminton World Circuit (2 titles, 1 runner-up) 
The BWF Para Badminton World Circuit – Grade 2, Level 1, 2 and 3 tournaments has been sanctioned by the Badminton World Federation from 2022.

Men's singles

International Tournaments (7 titles, 7 runners-up) 
Men's singles

Men's doubles

Mixed doubles

References 

Living people
Place of birth missing (living people)
Japanese male badminton players
Paralympic badminton players of Japan
Paralympic bronze medalists for Japan
Paralympic medalists in badminton
Badminton players at the 2020 Summer Paralympics
Medalists at the 2020 Summer Paralympics
21st-century Japanese people
1974 births